Dominik Kahun (born 2 July 1995) is a Czech-born German professional ice hockey forward who is currently playing with SC Bern of the National League (NL). He previously has played for the Chicago Blackhawks, Pittsburgh Penguins, Buffalo Sabres and Edmonton Oilers of the National Hockey League (NHL).

Playing career
Born in the Czech Republic, Kahun moved to Germany with his family as a child. Kahun played junior hockey with the Jungadler Mannheim U18 team, where he was the league's leading scorer for the 2011–12 season. He then moved to Canada where he played two seasons of major junior hockey with the Sudbury Wolves of the Ontario Hockey League (OHL).

On 4 April 2014, it was confirmed that Kahun had signed with EHC Red Bull München to begin his professional career with the 2014–15 season in the Deutsche Eishockey Liga (DEL). In 2016, he won the DEL title with München.

On 21 May 2018, Kahun as an undrafted free agent signed a two-year entry-level contract with the Chicago Blackhawks of the National Hockey League (NHL). Kahun made his NHL debut on 3 October  and recorded his first two NHL points, both assists, in a 7–6 overtime loss against the Toronto Maple Leafs on 8 October. He recorded his first career NHL goal on 11 October in a 4–3 overtime loss to the Minnesota Wild. He appeared in all 82 games with the Blackhawks in the 2018–19 season, providing scoring depth to Chicago, finishing tied 7th among all rookies in NHL scoring with 13 goals and 37 points.

On 15 June 2019, Kahun was traded by the Blackhawks to the Pittsburgh Penguins along with a 2019 fifth-round pick for Olli Maatta. Kahun scored his first goal with the Penguins on 26 October 2019 against the Dallas Stars. Kahun was injured on 19 January 2020, suffering a concussion during a game against the Boston Bruins. He returned to the line-up on 18 February after missing 8 games. In 50 games with the Pittsburgh Penguins, Kahun added 10 goals and 17 assists. On 24 February 2020, he was traded to the Buffalo Sabres in exchange for Conor Sheary and Evan Rodrigues. Kahun made six appearances with the Sabres, collecting two goals and 4 points before the regular season was initially paused then concluded due to the COVID-19 pandemic.

Due to salary cap considerations, Kahun was not tendered a qualifying offer by the Sabres during the offseason, making him a free agent. On 1 November 2020, Kahun was signed to a one-year, $975,000 contract by the Edmonton Oilers, joining countryman and league MVP Leon Draisaitl. With the 2020–21 NHL season set to be delayed due to the pandemic, Kahun was loaned by the Oilers to return to his German club, EHC München of the DEL, on 6 November 2020, until the commencement of Edmonton's training camp.

On 6 September 2021, Kahun joined SC Bern of the National League (NL) as a free agent on a three-year deal through the end of the 2023/24 season.. On 22 August 2022, SC Bern and Dominik Kahun agreed to another three year extension that runs until 2026/27.

International play

Kahun made his senior international debut by representing Germany at the Ice Hockey World Championships in 2016 and later featured in the, 2017, 2018, and 2019 events.

Kahun represented Germany at the 2018 Winter Olympics, earning a silver medal.

Personal life
Kahun has a brother, Phillip, who is seven years younger than him, and a sister, Karolina, who is fourteen years his junior. He grew up in the small town of Weiden in der Oberpfalz, Germany, after moving there from the Czech Republic at the age of three, though he continued to play hockey in the Czech Republic for a time.

Career statistics

Regular season and playoffs

International

Awards and honours

References

External links
 

1995 births
SC Bern players
Buffalo Sabres players
Chicago Blackhawks players
Edmonton Oilers players
German ice hockey forwards
Czech emigrants to Germany
German expatriate sportspeople in the United States
Ice hockey players at the 2018 Winter Olympics
Living people
Medalists at the 2018 Winter Olympics
EHC München players
Olympic ice hockey players of Germany
Olympic medalists in ice hockey
Olympic silver medalists for Germany
People from Planá
Pittsburgh Penguins players
SC Riessersee players
Sudbury Wolves players
Undrafted National Hockey League players
Ice hockey players at the 2022 Winter Olympics
German expatriate sportspeople in Switzerland
German expatriate sportspeople in Canada
German expatriate ice hockey people
Expatriate ice hockey players in Canada
People from Weiden in der Oberpfalz
Sportspeople from the Upper Palatinate
Czech expatriate ice hockey players in the United States
Czech expatriate ice hockey players in Canada
Czech expatriate ice hockey players in Switzerland